Calystegia × pulchra, commonly known as hairy bindweed, is a species of morning glory. It is a climbing plant that may exceed three meters in height. The bright pink corolla may be 5 to 7 centimeters and has distinct white stripes. This species is a weedy wildflower which has naturalized in many areas, including much of Europe and is also grown as an ornamental plant.

References

pulchra
Plant nothospecies
Flora of Europe
Vines